Liu He (born 25 January 1952) is a Chinese economist and politician who served as a vice premier of the People's Republic of China from 2018 to 2023 and a member of the Politburo of the Chinese Communist Party from 2017 to 2022. Liu is also the director of the Office serving the Central Financial and Economic Affairs Commission of the Chinese Communist Party (CCP); the latter headed by CCP General Secretary Xi Jinping. He was named vice-premier on 19 March 2018 and is heading the Financial Stability and Development Committee.

Early life and Education
Liu attended Beijing 101 Middle School for middle and high school, which a lot of elite Princelings studied here, such as Xi Jinping. He was sent down to Taonan, Jilin during the Cultural Revolution. In 1970, he joined 82nd Group Army, and once became a deputy squad leader. He retired from army after three years, and was assigned to Beijing Radio Factory as a worker for another three years. He joined the CCP in December 1976. He received a Bachelor of Science in Industrial Economics and Management from Renmin University of China in 1983 and a Master of Science in Industrial Economics in 1986. He was a visiting scholar at Seton Hall University School of Business from 1992 to 1993. He received a Master of Public Administration from Harvard Kennedy School in 1995.

Career
He has published widely on macroeconomics, Chinese industrial and economic development policy, new economic theory and the information industry. He worked successively for the National Planning Commission, the State Information Center, and the Development Research Center of the State Council.

Beginning in 2013, Liu began advising General Secretary Xi Jinping on a series of economic initiatives and was believed to be one of the primary architects of Chinese economic policy at the time. He was also a member of the CCP 18th Central Committee.  Liu gave a keynote address to the 2018 World Economic Forum in Davos.

At the CCP 19th National Congress in October 2017, Liu was promoted to the CCP Politburo. In March 2018, Liu He was appointed as a Vice Premier of the People's Republic of China. In May 2018, Liu He was also appointed top trade negotiator for the China–United States trade war. In early October 2019, Liu He negotiated with his US counterparts on a preliminary trade deal.

He is the head of the Financial Stability and Development Committee, and has been one of the key officials in the crackdown on Ant Group.

Politics
He has been described as "one of the technocrats that Xi Jinping trusts a great deal".

Family
He is the father of Liu Tianran, chair of Tianyi Ziteng Asset Management (alternatively known as Skycus Capital).

References 

Living people
Harvard Kennedy School alumni
1952 births
Vice Premiers of the People's Republic of China
People's Republic of China politicians from Beijing
Renmin University of China alumni
People's Republic of China economists
Members of the 18th Central Committee of the Chinese Communist Party
Members of the 19th Politburo of the Chinese Communist Party
Delegates to the 13th National People's Congress
Seton Hall University alumni
Economists from Beijing
Chinese Communist Party politicians from Beijing